Ishmael and the Return of the Dugongs is a fiction book by Michael Gerard Bauer, released in 2007. It is the first sequel to Don't Call Me Ishmael. Ishmael and the Return of the Dugongs won the "Book Council of Australia: Junior Judges Award" in 2007.

Plot summary
The novel continues on from the end of Don't Call Me Ishmael. It is about a fifteen-year-old boy named Ishmael Leseur and his friends/debating team- James Scobie, Ignatius Prindabel, Orazio Zorzotto and Bill Kingsley. Ishmael tries to get with an attractive girl named Kelly Faulkner, at the same time as keeping away from the school bully, Barry Bagsley. Along with that, Ishmael's father's band, "The Dugongs" tries to reform.

Recommended
It is recommended to read the first book (Don't Call Me Ishmael!) first to understand the true plot.

Australian young adult novels
Novels by Michael Gerard Bauer
CBCA Children's Book of the Year Award Notable Books